Sami Moubayed (born 16 July 1978) is a Syrian historian and writer who has written extensively on the modern history of Damascus from the late Ottoman period until creation of the United Arab Republic in 1958. 

In 2017 he co-founded The Damascus History Foundation, a non-governmental organization aimed at preserving the archives of the ancient city of Damascus, threatened with extinction because of age, poor preservation, or neglect, becoming its founding chairman.

Biography

Sami Moubayed, a native of Damascus, studied at the Faculty of Political Science at the American University of Beirut (AUB). Moubayed, obtained his PhD in Middle East Studies from the University of Exeter, specializing in the founding years of the Syrian Republic. During his college years, Moubayed was mentored by Munir al-Ajlani, a ranking parliamentarian and politician from the pre-Baath Era. His first book, The Politics of Damascus 1920–1946, was published under Ajlani's supervision in 1998.

In 2000, Moubayed joined the Arab Political Document Center at AUB and worked as a journalist with Beirut-based The Daily Star. Between 2005 and 2011, Moubayed taught at the Faculty of International Relations at the University of Kalamoon in Deir Atiyah, 88-km north of the capital Damascus, while serving on its Board of Trustees. Between January 2007 and December 2011, he was editor-in-chief of Forward Magazine, Syria's premier English-monthly. In 2012, he joined the Carnegie Endowment for International Peace in Beirut, serving as a scholar on Syria until early 2014.

Over the last 20-years, Moubayed has interviewed leading regional and international figures including Turkish President Recep Tayyip Erdogan, Former Indian President Pratibha Patil, Former Iraqi Prime Minister Iyad Allawi and Former French Foreign Minister Bernard Kouchner. Moubayed has also interviewed Former Lebanese presidents Amin Gemayel, Elias Hrawi, and Émile Lahoud, in addition to Former Lebanese Prime Ministers Salim al-Hoss and Tammam Salam. In December 2008, he was the first Syrian to interview a US president, being Jimmy Carter. Additionally, Moubayed has been accredited with landmark interviews with Brazilian best-selling author Paolo Coelho and Wikipedia founder Jimmy Wales.

Works 

In 2004, along with Syrian web-designer Sahban Abd Rabbo, Moubayed co-founded www.syrianhistory.com, an online museum of Syrian history containing over 10,000 photographs, documents, and rare audiovisual material on Syria during the years 1900–2000. The website also contains unpublished audio clips from historical Syrian figures.

Moubayed has written much about pre-Baath Syria, and in 2016, was voted into the London-based Royal Historical Society

Selected works 

He is the author of several books on modern Syria, including:

The Politics of Damascus 1920-1946, (Damascus, 1998)
Damascus Between Democracy and Dictatorship, (Maryland, 2000)
Steel & Silk: Men and Women Who Shaped Syria 1900-2000, (Cune Press, 2005)
Syria and the USA: From Wilson to Eisenhower, (IB Tauris, 2012)
Under the Black Flag: At the Frontier of the New Jihad, (IB Tauris, 2015) 
Forgotten Tales from Damascus: Four Stories 1916-1936, (Arabic, Riad El Rayyes Books, Beirut 2016)
East of the Grand Umayyad: Damascene Freemasonry 1868-1965, (Arabic, Riad El Rayyes Books, Beirut 2017)
West of the Damascus Synagogue (Arabic, Riad El Rayyes Books, Beirut 2018)
The Makers of Modern Syria 1918-1958: The rise and fall of Syrian Democracy 1918-1958 (IB Tauris, London 2018)

In 2015, he compiled the correspondences of Syrian nationalist Abdul Rahman Shahbandar and Prime Minister Hasan al-Hakim, penned during the years 1926–1936. In 2018, he edited and compiled the memoirs of Husni al-Barazi, Syria's Prime Minister during World War II, and Ahmad al-Sharabati, Syria's defense minister during the Arab-Israeli War of 1948.

References

External links 
 Sami Moubayed Homepage . Retrieved 1 April 2007
 Forward Magazine
 The Washington Post, PostGlobal Panelist. Retrieved 1 April 2007
 Articles from worldpoliticswatch. Retrieved 1 April 2007
 Syria History Museum. Retrieved 1 April 2007

Moubayed, Sami
Moubayed, Sami
Moubayed, Sami
Moubayed, Sami
Moubayed, Sami
Moubayed, Sami
HuffPost writers and columnists
1978 births
Living people
Historians of Syria